The border between Botswana and South Africa is  long. More than 90% of the border follows rivers, including the Nossob, Molopo, Marico and Limpopo.

Geography

The western terminus of the border is at the tripoint with Namibia, located where the Nossob River crosses the 20th meridian east. From this terminus the border runs south-east along the Nossob River to its confluence with the Molopo River; in this area the border passes through the Kgalagadi Transfrontier Park. From the confluence the border runs generally eastwards along the Molopo River as far as the Ramatlabama Spruit, and then up the Spruit as far as the pool at Ramatlabama.

From Ramatlabama the border turns northwards, and is made up of a series of straight lines through beacons at Matlhase, Sebataole, Schaapkuil and Pytlanganyane to Sengoma on the Ngotwane River. It then follows the Ngotwane past Ramotswa to its confluence with the Metsemaswaane Stream. The border turns eastwards along a series of straight lines joining beacons on the Moshweu Hills, Wildebeeskop and the Sikwane Hills to Derdepoort on the Marico River. It then follows the Marico River to its confluence with the Crocodile River. The Marico and the Crocodile join to form the Limpopo River, and the border runs along the Limpopo to its confluence with the Shashe River, which is the tripoint with Zimbabwe.

History
The western portion of the border from the Namibian tripoint to Ramatlabama was the border between British Bechuanaland to the south and the Bechuanaland Protectorate to the north. British Bechuanaland was constituted as a Crown Colony by proclamation in 1885, and incorporated the lands of the Tswana people situated to the south of the Molopo River, west of the South African Republic (the Transvaal) and not already part of the Cape Colony. The Tswana lands north of the Molopo were at the same time brought under British protection as the Bechuanaland Protectorate. British Bechuanaland was annexed to the Cape Colony in 1895. The Order in Council authorising the annexation also extended the border northwards to include the land between the Molopo and the Nossob River, which is now the Mier area and the South African section of the Kgalagadi Transfrontier Park.

The Order in Council of 3 October 1895 defined the northern border of British Bechuanaland as

The eastern portion of the border from Ramatlabama to the Zimbabwean tripoint was the border between the South African Republic (ZAR) and the Bechuanaland Protectorate, and was defined by the Pretoria Convention of 1881 and the London Convention of 1884 which superseded it. These conventions settled the bounds of the ZAR, which subsisted until it was annexed to the British Empire during the Second Anglo-Boer War, becoming the Transvaal Colony. The London Convention defined the western border of the ZAR as

Crossings

The border has a large number of official crossings, the most important of which are Skilpadshek/Pioneer Gate on the Trans-Kalahari Corridor and Ramatlabama on the road and railway from Mahikeng to Gaborone. The crossings are listed from west to east in the table below.

References

 
Borders of South Africa
South Africa
International borders